The list of ship launches in 1797 includes a chronological list of some ships launched in 1797.


References 

1797
Ship launches